Devil Take Us is a 1952 American short documentary film on driving safety directed by Herbert Morgan. It was part of the Theatre of Life documentary series. It was nominated for two Academy Awards, one for Best Documentary Short and the other for Best Two-Reel Short.

References

External links

1952 films
American short documentary films
American black-and-white films
1950s short documentary films
1952 documentary films
1952 short films
1950s English-language films
1950s American films